Jack Grimes (born 11 May 1989) is a former professional Australian rules footballer who played for and is a former captain of the Melbourne Football Club in the Australian Football League (AFL).

He was named as an All-Australian at the 2007 NAB AFL U18 Championships. He was drafted by Melbourne in the 2007 National Draft at pick 14, but was placed on the long-term injury list due to stress-related back problems. He made his debut in the final game of the 2008 AFL season but suffered a further back injury in the early part of the 2009 season.

He returned in round 7 and played eleven games in 2009, including Round 14 against West Coast when he was awarded three Brownlow Medal votes and was nominated for the AFL Rising Star award.

Jack Grimes suffered a season-ending injury in the round 7 match against the Adelaide Crows.

On 3 February 2012 he was named, alongside fellow youngster Jack Trengove as the co-captain of Melbourne Football Club. At 22 years of age he was one of the youngest ever captains in VFL/AFL history. In 2014, Grimes continued on as co-captain, this time with Nathan Jones. However, on 1 December 2014 it was announced that he had stepped down as the club's co-captain.

Grimes was delisted at the conclusion of the 2016 season, during which he played his 100th and final AFL game.

For the 2017 season Grimes signed with the Hurstbridge Football Club in the Northern Football League.

Statistics

|- style="background:#eaeaea;"
! scope="row" style="text-align:center" | 2008
|  || 16 || 1 || 0 || 0 || 3 || 5 || 8 || 2 || 1 || 0.0 || 0.0 || 3.0 || 5.0 || 8.0 || 2.0 || 1.0
|-
! scope="row" style="text-align:center" | 2009
|  || 16 || 11 || 2 || 1 || 134 || 92 || 226 || 94 || 24 || 0.2 || 0.1 || 12.2 || 8.4 || 20.6 || 8.5 || 2.2
|- style="background:#eaeaea;"
! scope="row" style="text-align:center" | 2010
|  || 16 || 14 || 0 || 1 || 181 || 124 || 305 || 81 || 32 || 0.0 || 0.1 || 12.9 || 8.9 || 21.8 || 5.1 || 2.2
|-
! scope="row" style="text-align:center" | 2011
|  || 16 || 6 || 1 || 1 || 68 || 46 || 114 || 32 || 11 || 0.2 || 0.2 || 11.3 || 7.7 || 19.0 || 5.3 || 1.8
|- style="background:#eaeaea;"
! scope="row" style="text-align:center" | 2012
|  || 16 || 21 || 1 || 6 || 301 || 166 || 467 || 122 || 81 || 0.0 || 0.3 || 14.3 || 7.9 || 22.2 || 5.8 || 3.9
|-
! scope="row" style="text-align:center" | 2013
|  || 31 || 15 || 1 || 3 || 150 || 124 || 274 || 69 || 63 || 0.1 || 0.2 || 10.0 || 8.3 || 18.3 || 4.6 || 4.2
|- style="background:#eaeaea;"
! scope="row" style="text-align:center" | 2014
|  || 31 || 18 || 3 || 2 || 178 || 157 || 335 || 86 || 40 || 0.2 || 0.1 || 9.9 || 8.7 || 18.6 || 4.8 || 2.2
|-
! scope="row" style="text-align:center" | 2015
|  || 31 || 12 || 3 || 3 || 133 || 105 || 238 || 70 || 29 || 0.3 || 0.3 || 11.1 || 8.8 || 19.9 || 5.8 || 2.4
|- style="background:#eaeaea;"
! scope="row" style="text-align:center" | 2016
|  || 31 || 2 || 0 || 0 || 22 || 25 || 47 || 13 || 10 || 0.0 || 0.0 || 11.0 || 12.5 || 23.5 || 6.5 || 5.0
|- class="sortbottom"
! colspan=3| Career
! 100
! 11
! 17
! 1170
! 844
! 2014
! 569
! 294
! 0.1
! 0.2
! 11.7
! 8.4
! 20.1
! 5.7
! 2.9
|}

References

External links

Demon Wiki profile

Melbourne Football Club players
1989 births
Living people
Australian rules footballers from Victoria (Australia)
Northern Knights players
Casey Demons players
Melbourne Football Club captains